Ohkuboyama Dam is an earthfill dam located in Ehime Prefecture in Japan. The dam is used for irrigation and water supply. The catchment area of the dam is 5.5 km2. The dam impounds about 6  ha of land when full and can store 750 thousand cubic meters of water. The construction of the dam was started on 1973 and completed in 1979.

References

Dams in Ehime Prefecture
1979 establishments in Japan